Occult Hymn is an EP by Danger Doom, released in 2006 as the follow-up to their debut album, The Mouse and the Mask. It contains seven tracks and was released as a free download on Adult Swim's website on May 30, 2006. Its name is a reference to a line in Danger Doom's song "A.T.H.F.", and intentionally rhymes with "Adult Swim." The original EP contains 2 new tracks, 3 remixes, and 2 skits; on the re-release, 2 more new tracks were added.

Track listing

References

Albums free for download by copyright owner
Albums produced by Danger Mouse (musician)
Danger Mouse (musician) albums
MF Doom albums
Adult Swim albums
2006 debut EPs